The Producers Guild Film Award for Best Actress in a Supporting Role (previously known as the Apsara Award for Best Actress in a Supporting Role) is given by the producers of the film and television guild as part of its annual award ceremony for Hindi films, to recognise a female actor who has delivered an outstanding performance in a supporting role. Following its inception in 2004, no one was awarded in 2005 and 2007.

† - indicates the performance also won the Filmfare Award.
‡ - indicates the performance was also nominated for the Filmfare Award.  
§ - indicates a Producers Guild Film Award-winning performance that was not nominated for a Filmfare Award.

Superlatives

Tabu with two consecutive wins (2015-2016), has more Best Supporting Actress wins than any other actress.

There has been only one tie in the history of this category. This occurred in 2016 when Tabu and Tanvi Azmi were both given the award.

Divya Dutta and Konkona Sen Sharma hold the record for most nominations in the Best Supporting Actress category, with 3, followed by Supriya Pathak, Kirron Kher, Kalki Koechlin, Kangana Ranaut, Dimple Kapadia, Anushka Sharma & Tabu who have 2 nominations each.

Multiple nominees
 3 Nominations : Divya Dutta, Konkona Sen Sharma
 2 Nominations : Kirron Kher, Kangana Ranaut, Supriya Pathak, Kalki Koechlin, Dimple Kapadia, Anushka Sharma & Tabu

Winners and nominees
Winners are listed first in bold, followed by the other nominees.

2000s

2010s

See also
Producers Guild Film Awards
Producers Guild Film Award for Best Actress in a Leading Role

Producers Guild Film Awards
Film awards for supporting actress